DPN may refer to:

Science and medicine
Dermatosis papulosa nigra, a skin condition
Diabetic Peripheral Neuropathy, a diabetic neuropathy often associated with sensations of burning, shooting, and tingling
Diarylpropionitrile, a synthetic, nonsteroidal compound
Diphosphopyridine nucleotide, an old name for Nicotinamide adenine dinucleotide (NAD+), a coenzyme found in all living cells
Diffuse proliferative nephritis, a medical condition

Other uses
Deaf President Now, a 1988 student protest at Gallaudet University to force the university to hire a deaf president
Democratic Party of Namibia
Democratic Party of Nauru, a political party in the Pacific nation of Nauru
Designated Portsmouth Number, a measure in the Portsmouth Yardstick system of handicapping for dissimilar boats in a race
Dip-pen nanolithography, a scanning probe lithography technique
Diseased Pariah News (1990–1999), a U.S. magazine about living with HIV and AIDS
Double pointed needles, a type of knitting needle